The 2019–20 Lechia Gdańsk season was the club's 76th season of existence, and their 12th continuous in the top flight of Polish football. The season covered the period from 1 July 2019 to 31 July 2020.

Season information

Due to the COVID-19 pandemic Polish authorities announced on 10 March 2020 that all Ekstraklasa, I liga, and Polish Cup fixtures would be played behind closed doors without fans in attendance. Lechia played Piast Gliwice in the Polish Cup behind closed doors, before an announcement was made on 14 March that all games would be postponed until the end of March. The postponement was further delayed on 20 March with no games being played until at least 26 April. Games were allowed to resume again from 29 May, 12 weeks after the season was postponed.

Players

First team squad

 (on loan from Liepāja) 
 
 

 
 

 (on loan from Cracovia)

 
 (on loan from Benfica) 

 
 

 

 

 (on loan from Anderlecht) 

 
 

Key

Out on loan

Transfers

In

Out

Competitions

Friendlies

Summer

Winter

Polish Super Cup

Ekstraklasa

Regular season

League table

Championship round

League table

Polish Cup

Europa League

Statistics

Goalscorers

References

Lechia Gdańsk seasons
Lechia Gdańsk
Lechia Gdańsk